Martin Jensen (born 29 September 1991) is a Danish DJ and record producer best known for the 2016 single "Solo Dance". His videos feature sounds sampled from viral videos and made into tropical house mixes. He has over 10 years of experience of being club DJ, in Sunny Beach. In October 2016, he was ranked 82 out of the 100 best DJs in the world by DJ Magazine. In 2018, he was ranked 56 out of the 100 best DJs in the world. In October 2019, Jensen was ranked 45 out of DJ Mag's 100 best DJs in the world placing 9 positions higher than the previous year.

Early life 
Martin was born in Silkeborg, Denmark in 1991. He trained as a contractor and machine mechanic. He worked as a seller at the machine trader Sorring Maskinhandel, which was founded by his father, Jørgen Jensen, in 1990. He started DJing at an early age, but became widely known in 2014.

Personal life 

Martin Jensen dated Irish model Natasha Samsara until 2021, where they met in Bangkok, Thailand.

Career 
His first single is called "Sí", which is a remix of a Cristiano Ronaldo celebration at the 2014 FIFA Ballon d'Or, gained him a lot of popularity in many Latin countries. His breakthrough came with the single "Miracles" in 2015, featuring Danish singer Bjørnskov, with more than 20 million streams on Spotify. In 2016, he released the single "All I Wanna Do" which also became a success, with more than 60 million streams at Spotify. His latest single "Solo Dance" from 2016, also became a success, and has so far made it into top 44 of Spotify's Global Top 50, with over 1,200,000 daily streams. In 2017, Jensen released the song "Wait" featuring New York-based duo Loote. In 2018, he released the singles "Pull up" and "16 Steps" (with Olivia Holt). 20 October 2018 saw the release of his first EP titled World. The EP consists of the songs "Rio", "Djoba" (with DOLF), "Pharaoh", "Osaki" and "Valhalla" (with Faustix), which were released over five days starting 15 October.

On 10 April 2020, he premiered "Me, Myself, Online", a live event broadcast on Twitch from Parken Stadium, with a peak viewership of over 35,000 people. Following the success of the event, he presented further broadcasts from a private hangar at Billund airport on 24 April, and on the rear deck of the HDMS Niels Juel (F363) on 8 May.

On 11 September 2020, it was announced that Jensen would replace Ankerstjerne as a judge for the fourteenth season of X Factor alongside returning judges Thomas Blachman and Oh Land.

Discography

Singles

Remixes
2019: Declan J Donovan — "Vienna" (Martin Jensen Remix)
2020: Kid Cudi — "Day 'n' Nite" (Martin Jensen Edit)
2020: Giiants x Maylyn — "Yellow" (Martin Jensen Edit)
2020: Gabry Ponte — "Give My All" (Martin Jensen Edit)

Notes

References

1991 births
Living people
People from Silkeborg
Danish record producers
Danish dance musicians
Danish DJs
Remixers
Electronic musicians
Tropical house musicians
Electronic dance music DJs